34 Canadian Brigade Group (34CBG) is a Primary Reserve component of 2nd Canadian Division, under the Canadian Army. It is headquartered in Montreal, Quebec. It is the successor of the Cold War-era Montreal Militia District.

Brigade units

Units that support the 34 Canadian Brigade Group include the 438 Tactical Helicopter Squadron, 41 Military Police Platoon and the 4 Intelligence Company.

See also

35 Canadian Brigade Group, the other such brigade formation in the province of Quebec.
CFB Montreal

References

External links

Brigades of the Canadian Army
Organizations based in Montreal
1997 establishments in Quebec